Nalini Bhushan is an American philosopher and the Andrew W. Mellon Professor in the Humanities at Smith College. Her work is on the philosophy of chemistry and  Indian philosophy, among other subjects.

Lee C. McIntyre described Bhushan's edited volume Of Minds and Molecules (2000), co-edited with her husband Stuart Rosenfeld, as an effort to provide a "synthesis" of the field to date. A review in Philosophy of Science stated that the essays collected in Of Minds and Molecules were "helping" philosophy of chemistry "to take its place in the world of ideas". Another reviewer noted, however, that a number of anthologies of papers in the field had previously been published, and thus that the book's claim to be the "first" such anthology was probably inaccurate.

Her monograph Minds without Fear: Philosophy in the Indian Renaissance (2017), co-authored with Jay L. Garfield, argues that Indian intellectual life during the British Raj was vibrant—contrary to the assumptions of many scholars. Minds without Fear was the subject of several essays in a symposium in Sophia.

Selected bibliography

Notes 

21st-century American philosophers
Smith College faculty
American women philosophers
Year of birth missing (living people)
Living people
20th-century American philosophers
20th-century American women
21st-century American women